Anne Lafont (born 1970) is a French art historian. She is a researcher and director of studies at the School for Advanced Studies in the Social Sciences. She specializes in visual and artistic cultures.

Her work focuses on the pictorial art of the 18th century and the 19th century, in particular on the representation of black bodies at the time of slavery, as well as on the place of black art in relation to colonial, and postcolonial heritage. She is considered one of the pioneers in France.

Life 
Anne Lafont was born in France in 1970. She studied in Canada, where she obtained a Bachelor of Arts in art history in 1993. In 1999 she became a resident at the Villa Medici, as a doctoral student in art history and archeology. In 2001, she obtained her doctorate, at the University of Paris IV, with a thesis on the French painter Anne-Louis Girodet.

In 2003, Anne Lafont became lecturer in modern art history at the University of Marne-la-Vallée, becoming head of the art history department in 2005.

In 2007, she joined the National Institute of Art History (INHA)9. She was first responsible for research programs in the field of artistic historiography, then became editor-in-chief of the INHA journal, Perspective.

In 2017, she was elected director of studies at the EHESS on a research project entitled "History of art and creolities".

In February 2019, she published Art and Race: the African (everything) against the eye of the Enlightenment, the culmination of ten years of research work, which is hailed for the quality of its analyses. The book won the Maryse-Condé literary prize in the “Research” category as well as the Vitale-et-Arnold-Blokh prize.

She was a member of the scientific council for the exhibition “Le model noir”, presented from March to July 2019 at the Musée d’Orsay in Paris, then at the Mémorial Acte in Guadeloupe.

In 2019 and 2020, Lafont organized a conference at the University of Quebec in Montreal,  a colloquium at the Collège de France, as well as edited an issue of the  Critique review, entitled “Black Art”.

Works

References 

Living people
1970 births
French art historians
People from Paris
Women art historians
21st-century French historians
French women historians
Paris-Sorbonne University alumni
University of Paris-Est Marne-la-Vallée